The International Academy for Philosophy of Science, better known as the  (AIPS) is an international organization located in Brussels, which promotes fundamental issues of philosophy of science in an open interdisciplinary dialogue. Its members are philosophers of science or leading experts in sciences interested in philosophical questions.

History
The AIPS was created in 1947 by Stanislas Dockx. Among its first members were Paul Bernays, E W Beth, Józef Maria Bocheński, Niels Bohr, Émile Borel, L. E. J. Brouwer, Louis de Broglie, Albert Einstein, Ferdinand Gonseth, E A Milne, and Hermann Weyl. In 1991, the Academy was made an International Member of the International Union of History and Philosophy of Science, Division of Logic, Methodology and Philosophy of Science (IUHPS/DLMPS).

Organization
The AIPS consists of full members (membres titulaires), corresponding members (membres correspondants), and emeritus members (membres émérites) who are elected at the general annual meeting on presentation of the Academic Council (Conseil Académique). The Council consists of a President, two Vice-Presidents, two Assessors and a Secretary General. The current President is Gerhard Heinzmann (Nancy); the list of former presidents includes Evandro Agazzi (Genoa). Other members of the current Council are Michel Ghins, Gino Tarozzi, Marco Buzzoni, and Itala M. Loffredo D'Ottaviano. Since 1949, the AIPS organises a series of annual conferences, usually in Europe with notable exceptions (New York 1977 and Lima 1989).

Members
The AIPS currently has over one hundred members, among them
Evandro Agazzi
Mario Bunge
Jeremy Butterfield
Nancy Cartwright
Gregory Chaitin
Noam Chomsky
Newton da Costa
Michael Detlefsen
Dennis Dieks
John Earman
Luciano Floridi
Tamaz Gamkrelidze
Ian Hacking
Hannes Leitgeb
Sabina Leonelli
Benedikt Löwe
Lorenzo Magnani
Michela Massimi
Ilkka Niiniluoto
John D. Norton
Steven Pinker
Stathis Psillos
Nicholas Rescher
John Searle
Elliott Sober
Bas van Fraassen
Charlotte Werndl

References 

 01
Scientific organisations based in Belgium